Penan, also known as Punan-Nibong, is a language complex spoken by the Penan people of Borneo. They are related to the Kenyah languages.  Glottolog shows Western Penan as closer to Sebop than it is to Eastern Penan.

References

External links

ELAR archive of Eastern Penan

Kenyah languages
Languages of Malaysia
Languages of Brunei